Martha Wardrop is a Scottish Green politician. She is a Glasgow city councillor, first elected in the Hillhead ward in 2007 and subsequently re-elected in 2012, 2017 and 2022.

Between 2011 and 2013, she was joint convenor of the party.

Awards and honours
In 2015, she jointly won 'politician of the year' at RSPB's Nature of Scotland Awards.

References

Living people
Alumni of the University of Strathclyde
Alumni of the University of Glasgow
Leaders of the Scottish Green Party
People educated at Buckhaven High School
People from Upper Largo
Scottish pacifists
1969 births
Scottish Green Party councillors
Hillhead
Women councillors in Glasgow